Galumna levisensilla is a species of mite first found in sandy soil in a dipterocarp forest of Cát Tiên National Park.

References

Further reading
Ermilov, S. G., A. E. Anichkin, and I. V. Pal’ko. "Oribatid mites (Acari) from nests of some birds in South Vietnam." Entomological review 93.6 (2013): 799-804.
Ermilov, Sergey G., and Alexander E. Anichkin. "A new species of Ramuselloppia (Acari: Oribatida: Oppiidae) from Vietnam." Persian Journal of Acarology 2.1 (2013).

Sarcoptiformes
Arthropods of Vietnam